Agonidium gracile is a species of ground beetle in the subfamily Platyninae. It was described by Peringuey in 1896.

References

gracile
Beetles described in 1896